Jagannadhapuram is a village in NTR District of the Indian state of Andhra Pradesh. It is located in veerullapadu mandal of  Nandigama revenue division.

History 

It is believed that a man named "Jagannathan" first settled in this village along with his family. It is from him that the village acquired its name. Initially, Hindus from ponnavaram settled in jagannadhapuram. After them families of Bonthu, Thanam, Thumma, Syamala, Bandi, Udumula, Thirumalareddy, Yeruva came from Paatibandla in Guntur district and settled here. Merugumala, vemula Singu Raju families also live here.

Christianity and Hinduism are major religions that are followed.

Politics 
The Gram panchayat seat was won by YSR Congress Party.

Jagannadhapuram, NTR district under Veerullapadu mandal is represented by Nandigama (SC) (Assembly constituency), which in turn represents Vijayawada (Lok Sabha constituency)  of Andhra Pradesh. The present MLA representing Nandigama (SC) (Assembly constituency) is Mondithoka Jaganmohan Rao of YSRC Party.

References

Villages in NTR district